Glen Robert Sonmor (April 22, 1929 – December 14, 2015) was a Canadian professional ice hockey player, scout and coach. He played 28 games in the National Hockey League with the New York Rangers from 1953 to 1955, though most of his career was spent in the minor American Hockey League. After his playing career, Sonmor turned to coaching. He led the University of Minnesota from 1966 to 1972, then went to the World Hockey Association, where he was the general manager, and occasional coach, of the Minnesota Fighting Saints and Birmingham Bulls between 1972 and 1978. He then moved to the NHL to coach the Minnesota North Stars from 1978 to 1987. Later in his career, Sonmor became a scout for the Minnesota Wild of the NHL.

Early life
Born in Moose Jaw, Saskatchewan, Sonmor's family moved to Hamilton, Ontario, where he played on multiple school teams, playing point guard in basketball, quarterback in football and left wing in hockey, as well as pitching in semi-pro baseball. Sonmor focused on hockey after graduation and signed a C form with the Cleveland Barons of the American Hockey League, committing him to the team if he ever turned pro. Sonmor then played junior hockey with the Guelph Biltmores in the Ontario Hockey Association (OHA) and the Brandon Wheat Kings of the Manitoba Junior Hockey League (MJHL). The 1948–49 Brandon team went on to win the MJHL championship, defeating the Calgary Buffalos for the Abbott Cup, but lost in the Memorial Cup championship to the Montreal Royals. Sonmor led the way for the Wheat Kings with 18 goals and 30 assists in 30 regular season games and 10 goals and 14 assists in 25 playoff games. The 1948–49 team was named to the Manitoba Hockey Hall of Fame in 2006.

Professional career
In 1949, Sonmor was sent by Cleveland to the Minneapolis Millers in the United States Hockey League and his play attracted the attention of the parent club. From 1949 to 1954, Sonmor  played predominantly for the Barons, but  spent the 1951–52 season with the St. Louis Flyers, and recorded consecutive 20-goal seasons.

Sonmor spent part of the 1953–54 season with the National Hockey League (NHL) New York Rangers before Cleveland officially traded him to the team on 15 November 1954 for eventual Hall of Famer Andy Bathgate and Vic Howe. In the NHL, Sonmor was considered a highly physical player known for his fighting abilities, as he recorded only 2 goals in 30 games over the 1953–54 and 1954–55 seasons. On 27 February 1955, Sonmor suffered a career-ending injury to his left eye when he was hit by a slap shot from teammate Steve Kraftcheck. Sonmor's injury came four days after the birth of his daughter Kathy, putting both him and his wife in the hospital at the same time. Later stories of Sonmor's glass eye popping out onto the Minnesota North Stars bench during his coaching career are told by the North Stars' General Manager, Lou Nanne.

Coaching career
Following his retirement from the NHL, Sonmor was hired to be the freshman hockey coach at the University of Minnesota by longtime coach, and AHL and USHL teammate, John Mariucci. He then coached a number of amateur hockey teams including various levels in Junior hockey, at the Ohio State University, before returning to Minnesota as the varsity coach. Sonmor coached the University of Minnesota's Golden Gophers from 1966–71, which included a Western Collegiate Hockey Association (WCHA) regular season championship in the 1969–70 season and a WCHA playoff championship in the 1970–71 season.

In 1972, Sonmor moved up to the professional level when he joined the fledgling Minnesota Fighting Saints of the World Hockey Association (WHA) as coach and general manager. In the middle of the season, Sonmor gave up his coaching duties, but continued as GM. After the team folded in 1976, the WHA's Cleveland Crusaders moved to St. Paul and changed their name to the "New Fighting Saints", and Sonmor was hired as the team's coach and general manager. However, much like their predecessor the new Saints folded in January 1977. Sonmor then went on to coach the WHA's Birmingham Bulls and stayed there through the end of the 1977–78 season. In 1978, Sonmor was named head coach of the Minnesota North Stars of the National Hockey League (NHL) and went on to three different coaching tenures with the team (1978–1983, 1984–1985, and 1986–1987). Sonmor's teams made the playoffs four of six full seasons and he led the team to the 1981 Stanley Cup Finals, where they lost to the heavily-favored New York Islanders. However, Sonmor's career with the North Stars was overshadowed by several bar fights, and alcoholism that ultimately led him away time and time again from his coaching duties to enter treatment for alcoholism. He eventually gave up drinking in 1983 after being suspended by the North Stars in January after a particularly bad episode in Pittsburgh. Sonmor stepped down for good two games into the 1986-87 season for health reasons, leaving with a record of 174-161-82 in 417 games during his tenure.

Later life
After retiring as a coach, Sonmor predominantly worked as a radio analyst for University of Minnesota hockey games on the Golden Gopher Radio Network, which includes WCCO-AM. Sonmor is a recipient of an honorary "M" by the University and became an "M Club" Hall of Fame inductee in 2007. From 1994-96, Sonmor was the director of player development for the Minnesota Moose of the International Hockey League (IHL). In 2000, Sonmor was hired by the National Hockey League's Minnesota Wild, as a scout evaluating high school talent for the club in preparation for the NHL Entry Draft. On February 3, 2011, the then-81-year-old Sonmor announced that he planned to retire from the Gopher broadcast booth following the end of the 2011 season. During a February 18/19 series against the University of Wisconsin, Wally Shaver was joined in the WCCO broadcast booth by injured Gopher forward Zach Budish in lieu of Sonmor. Shortly following the series, it was announced that Sonmor would retire effective immediately, as opposed to finishing the season.

In 2006, Sonmor was awarded the Lester Patrick Trophy for outstanding service to hockey in the United States along with Steve Yzerman, Marcel Dionne, Reed Larson, and Red Berenson.

He is the author, with Ross Bernstein, of the autobiographical Old Time Hockey: Memories and Musings of a Lifetime on Ice.

Sonmor returned to Canada from the United States in 2013 and settled in Paris, Ontario. He died in a nursing home in Brantford, Ontario from pneumonia on December 14, 2015 at the age of 86. He also had Alzheimer's disease.

Career statistics

Regular season and playoffs

Head coaching record

College

†Sonmor resigned in December 1971

WHA

NHL

References

External links

Glen Sonmor's college hockey coaching record at College Hockey News

1929 births
2015 deaths
Brandon Wheat Kings players
Canadian ice hockey coaches
Canadian ice hockey left wingers
Cleveland Barons (1937–1973) players
Deaths from pneumonia in Ontario
Guelph Biltmore Mad Hatters players
Ice hockey people from Ontario
Lester Patrick Trophy recipients
Minnesota Golden Gophers men's ice hockey coaches
Minnesota Fighting Saints coaches
Minnesota Fighting Saints general managers
Minnesota North Stars coaches
Minnesota Wild scouts
New York Rangers players
Ohio State Buckeyes men's ice hockey coaches
Philadelphia Flyers scouts
St. Louis Flyers players
Sportspeople from Moose Jaw
Springfield Indians coaches
Sportspeople from the County of Brant